Dorytomus rufus is a species of true weevil in the beetle family Curculionidae found in North America.

References

Curculioninae
Beetles described in 1832